Skalunda is a village at Lidköping Municipality in Västergötland, Sweden. Skalunda was an important location dating to the Iron Age  and was one of the eight royal estates of early medieval Västergötland (cf. Uppsala öd). 

Skalunda is the site of  Skalunda Church  dating to the during  Middle Ages. 
At Skalunda there are also several ancient remains, including the site of  Skalunda Barrow,  a historic burial mound.

Skalunda Church
Skalunda Church (Skalunda kyrka) was built in the 12th century. 
The  Romanesque church is commonly believed to have originated as a  mission church.
The towerless church was built of finely hewn sandstone blocks. 
Arches were built in the 15th century and at the end of the 19th century were taken down.
The belfry was built in 1772 and has two church bells dating from the Middle Ages; the smaller church bells from early 13th century, the larger church bell  was cast in 1533.

Skalunda Barrow
To the west of  Skalunda Church  is Skalunda Barrow (Skalunda hög). It measures 65 metres across and it is 7 metres high.  The burial mound has not yet been excavated, but C14 surveys from the ground have dated it to the beginning of the 6th century. Next to the barrow there is a stone circle consisting of seven circularstones.

Swedish philologist, archaeologist and historian Birger Nerman (1888-1971) director of the Swedish Museum of National Antiquities, suggested Skalunda Barrow to be a likely burial site of the legendary hero Beowulf, a legendary Geatish king.  Skalunda is not far from Aranæs (Old Swedish) and Aranäs (Modern Swedish), which is the same name as Earnaness (Old English)  where the hero died in the epic Beowulf.

References

Other sources
Burström, Mats: (1996) Skalunda hög, historier kring en hög  Mellan bronssköld och JAS-plan. Glimtar av Lidköpingsbygdens historia.  pages 79–92.
Ewald, Gustaf: (1950) Är Skalunda hög kung Beowulfs grav? Västgöta-Bygden nr 1, pages 335–336. (Om *Birger Nermans och °Carl Otto Fasts idéer angående hednatima kungars gravplats.)
Flink, G.: (1986) Landet mellan Larva Bäsing och Skalundahögen Arkeologi i Sverige 1982–3.
Nerman, B.: (1956) När kom Västergötland under svearnas välde? Västergötlands fornminnesförenings tidskrift
Svärdström, Elisabeth: (1958–1970) Västergötlands runinskrifter
Thorstensson, Gunnar: (1996) Skalundahögen Västgötabygden, tidskrift för hembygdsarbete, natur- och kulturminnesvård. Västergötlands hembygdsförbund . Sid 10–11.

Archaeological sites in Sweden
Geats
Viking Age populated places
Tumuli in Sweden